The 2019 UEFA European Under-19 Championship (also known as UEFA Under-19 Euro 2019) was the 18th edition of the UEFA European Under-19 Championship (68th edition if the Under-18 and Junior eras are included), the annual international youth football championship organised by UEFA for the men's under-19 national teams of Europe. Armenia, which was selected by UEFA on 9 December 2016, hosted the final tournament.

A total of eight teams played in the final tournament, with players born on or after 1 January 2000 eligible to participate. Starting from this season, up to five substitutions were permitted per team in each match.

In the final, Spain defeated defending champions Portugal 2–0 to win their 11th title (8th in the U-19 era).

Qualification

All 55 UEFA nations entered the competition, and with the hosts Armenia qualifying automatically, the other 54 teams competed in the qualifying competition to determine the remaining seven spots in the final tournament. The qualifying competition consisted of two rounds: Qualifying round, which took place in autumn 2018, and Elite round, which took place in spring 2019.

Qualified teams
The following teams qualified for the final tournament.

Note: All appearance statistics include only U-19 era (since 2002).

Final draw
The final draw was held on 31 May 2019, 12:00 AMT (UTC+4), at the Armenia Marriott Hotel in Yerevan, Armenia. The eight teams were drawn into two groups of four teams. There was no seeding, except that the hosts Armenia were assigned to position A1 in the draw.

Venues
On 2 April 2019, the Football Federation of Armenia announced that 3 stadiums would host the tournament matches, all located in the capital Yerevan. A special fan zone dedicated to UEFA U19 with a small football court was built on the Opera Square of Yerevan.

Match officials
A total of 6 referees, 8 assistant referees and 2 fourth officials are appointed for the final tournament.

Referees
 Irfan Peljto
 Kristo Tohver
 Anastasios Papapetrou
 Nikola Dabanović
 Sergey Ivanov
 Filip Glova

Assistant referees
 Theodoros Georgiou
 Sagy Metzamber
 Aleksandr Radius
 Luke Portelli
 Dawid Golis 
 Valentin Avram
 Grega Kordež
 Stéphane De Almeida

Fourth officials
 Suren Baliyan
 Zaven Hovhannisyan

Squads

Each national team have to submit a squad of 20 players (Regulations Article 37).

Group stage

The final tournament schedule was announced on 7 June 2019.

The group winners and runners-up advance to the semi-finals.

Tiebreakers
In the group stage, teams are ranked according to points (3 points for a win, 1 point for a draw, 0 points for a loss), and if tied on points, the following tiebreaking criteria are applied, in the order given, to determine the rankings (Regulations Articles 16.01 and 16.02):
Points in head-to-head matches among tied teams;
Goal difference in head-to-head matches among tied teams;
Goals scored in head-to-head matches among tied teams;
If more than two teams are tied, and after applying all head-to-head criteria above, a subset of teams are still tied, all head-to-head criteria above are reapplied exclusively to this subset of teams;
Goal difference in all group matches;
Goals scored in all group matches;
Penalty shoot-out if only two teams have the same number of points, and they met in the last round of the group and are tied after applying all criteria above (not used if more than two teams have the same number of points, or if their rankings are not relevant for qualification for the next stage);
Disciplinary points (red card = 3 points, yellow card = 1 point, expulsion for two yellow cards in one match = 3 points);
UEFA coefficient for the qualifying round draw;
Drawing of lots.

All times are local, AMT (UTC+4).

Group A

Group B

Knockout stage
In the knockout stage, extra time and penalty shoot-out are used to decide the winner, if necessary.

Bracket

Semi-finals

Final

Goalscorers

Team of the tournament
The UEFA technical observers selected the following 11 players for the team of the tournament:

Broadcasting
All 15 live matches and highlights are available on UEFA.tv for all territories around the world.

Europe

Over Europe

References

External links
2019 #U19EURO finals: Armenia, UEFA.com

 
2019
Under-19 Championship
2019 Uefa European Under-19 Championship
2018–19 in Armenian football
2019 in youth association football
July 2019 sports events in Europe